Felhampton is a hamlet in Shropshire, England. The hamlet is located by the A49 road.

See also
Listed buildings in Wistanstow

References

Hamlets in Shropshire